Abdi Jama (born 1 November 1982) is a Somali British wheelchair basketball player. He was born in Burao, northwestern Somaliland and lives in Liverpool. He was selected to play for Team GB in the 2012 Summer Paralympics in London.

Personal life
Jama was born on 1 November 1982 in Burao, in northwestern Somalia. He lives in Liverpool, England and has 6 brothers and sisters. His family moved from Somalia to Toxteth in Liverpool due to the wars in Somalia. As a child, Jama was left paralysed at the age of 14. He thought that he could not have a sporting career, until he was introduced to wheelchair basketball by Ade Orogbemi. He is a 1 point player

Wheelchair basketball
Jama was introduced to wheelchair basketball by Ade Orogbemi, who was playing for Team GB at the time. Orogbemi went to Jama's school to run a taster session of wheelchair basketball. Jama later became a team-mate of Orogbemi in Team GB. He joined the Liverpool Vikings shortly after. In his career, Jama has represented Great Britain at the 2008 Summer Paralympic Games in Beijing, where his team won bronze. He has played for clubs in Italy and Australia. He currently plays for and trains with the Wolverhampton Rhinos.

In 2007, Jama played in his first championship, the 2007 European Wheelchair Basketball Championships in Wetzlar, where his team won silver. He participated in the 2008 Beijing Summer Paralympic Games for Team GB. The following year he played in the 2009 European Championships in Adana, southern Turkey, where, along with his team, won bronze. In 2010, Jama participated in the 2010 World Wheelchair Basketball Championships in Birmingham for Great Britain. Great Britain came fifth after losing 50–59 to France in the quarter-finals. In the 2011 European Championships in Nazareth, Israel, along with his team, he won gold.

References

Living people
1982 births
British men's wheelchair basketball players
Wheelchair basketball players at the 2008 Summer Paralympics
Wheelchair basketball players at the 2012 Summer Paralympics
Paralympic wheelchair basketball players of Great Britain
Paralympic bronze medalists for Great Britain
Somalian emigrants to the United Kingdom
Medalists at the 2008 Summer Paralympics
Medalists at the 2016 Summer Paralympics
Paralympic medalists in wheelchair basketball
Wheelchair basketball players at the 2020 Summer Paralympics